Easton Historic District is a national historic district at Easton, Talbot County, Maryland, United States. It is an urban district that covers most of the core of Easton. It contains approximately 900 buildings and structures arranged along a grid pattern of streets and alleys and is primarily residential with the Central Business District located in the western section near the Talbot County Courthouse on Washington Street.  It has a significant collection of 18th, 19th, and early-20th century buildings.

It was added to the National Register of Historic Places in 1980.

References

External links
, including undated photo, at Maryland Historical Trust
Boundary Map of the Easton Historic District, Talbot County, at Maryland Historical Trust

Easton, Maryland
Historic districts in Talbot County, Maryland
Federal architecture in Maryland
Greek Revival architecture in Maryland
Italianate architecture in Maryland
Historic districts on the National Register of Historic Places in Maryland
National Register of Historic Places in Talbot County, Maryland
1980 establishments in Maryland